In Greek mythology, Nana ( is a daughter of the Phrygian river-god Sangarius, identified with the river Sakarya located in present-day Turkey.

Mythology 
She became pregnant when an almond from an almond tree fell on her lap. The almond tree had sprung from the spot where the hermaphroditic Agdistis was castrated, becoming Cybele, the Mother of the Gods.

Nana abandoned the baby boy, who was tended by a he-goat. The baby, Attis, grew up to become Cybele's consort and lover.

See also 
 Maya Hero Twins
 Danae
 Myrrha

References

Bibliography 
 Pausanias, Description of Greece, with an English Translation by W.H.S. Jones, Litt.D., and H.A. Ormerod, M.A., in 4 Volumes. Cambridge, MA, Harvard University Press; London, William Heinemann Ltd. 1918. Online version at the Perseus Digital Library.
 Arnobius, Adversus Nationes, (the source for character's name).

External links 
 Theoi project: Nana
 Macedonianissues.blogspot.com: Nana

Nymphs
Cybele
Phrygian goddesses
Greek mythology of Anatolia